The 2018-19 season is Lee Man's second consecutive season in Hong Kong Premier League.

Squad 
As of 9 March 2019

 FP
 FP

 FP

 FP

 (on loan from Eastern)

 FP

 LP

Players' positions as per club's announcement.
Remarks:
LP These players are considered as local players in Hong Kong domestic football competitions.
FP These players are registered as foreign players.

Out on loan

Transfers

Transfers in

Transfers out

Loans in

Loans Out

Club officials

 Owner: Lee & Man Chemical Company Limited
 Chairperson:  Norman Lee
 Vice Chairperson: Kwok Ching Yee
 Director: Lam Chak Yu
 Head Coach:  Chan Hiu Ming
 Assistant coach:  Tsang Chiu Tat
 Technical Director:  Chan Hung Ping
 Academy Director:  Law Kwok Ho
 First-team goalkeeping coach:  Tong Ka Ming
 Fitness coach: Choi Chan In
 Performance analysts:  Law Chun Man, Yeung Lok Man

Friendlies

Pre-season

Matches

Table

Hong Kong Premier League

On 27 July 2018, the fixtures for the forthcoming season were announced, with the home match against Kitchee being the first match in the league of the season.

Results by round

Hong Kong Senior Challenge Shield

Hong Kong Sapling Cup

Hong Kong FA Cup

Squad statistics

Appearances
Players with no appearances not included in the list.

Goalscorers
Includes all competitive matches.

Clean sheets

Disciplinary record

References

Lee Man FC seasons
Hong Kong football clubs 2018–19 season